At Risk is a 2010 American TV movie directed by Tom McLoughlin and starring Andie MacDowell and Daniel Sunjata. It is based on the book of the same name by Patricia Cornwell, who has a small role as a waitress.

The film was followed by a sequel, The Front (2010), also directed by Tom McLoughlin.

Plot
Win Garano, an Apache nicknamed "Geronimo", is working for Monique "Money" Lamont in the Boston DA's department. Lamont is running for Governor of Massachusetts using the concept of "at risk" to try to gain votes, saying that everyone is at risk from crime but when she becomes governor it is the criminals who will be at risk. To promote her political campaign she re-opens and assigns Garano to a cold case concerning the murder of a 90-year-old woman 35 years previously, demonstrating to voters that she can clear up old crimes as well as new ones.

Jesus Baptista, a criminal, has recently been acquitted of drug dealing and arson. One evening he goes to Lamont's house and lies in wait for her. At the same time, Garano is visiting his grandmother "Nana", where he sees TV coverage of a press conference called by Lamont, during which she agrees in answer to an aggressive questioner that the investigator on the cold case is called "Geronimo". Upset by this he sends a text to Lamont submitting his resignation but immediately afterwards he receives a text threatening Nana's life unless he drops the case. He changes his mind and calls Lamont to tell her that he wishes to continue the investigation. At this point Baptista snatches Lamont and drags her into the house causing her to drop her mobile. Unable to contact her, Garano drives to her house where a fight ensues, resulting in Baptista being shot dead by Garano. Evidence is discovered that Baptista had apparently been paid to kill Lamont. Facts about the cold case are difficult to find and police corruption is suspected. It then emerges that there is a connection between the murder and the attack on Lamont.

Win and his partner Sykes race against the clock to figure out not only the murder of Vivian Finley but how it connects to Monique’s assault and the suicide of a fireman named Mark Holland.

Win and Sykes question Vivian’s daughter-in-law Kim who confesses to the murder and cover up but something doesn’t sit right with Win. Upon realizing that Kim Finley’s son is none other than Jesse Huber (Win’s former mentor and friend) it becomes a race against the clock to find Jesse before he could hurt Nana.

A shootout occurs and Sykes is killed as Win kills Jesse. The cold case of Vivian Finley is officially solved with her murderer having been killed himself. Win is seen standing at Sykes’ graveside in Knoxville and he begins to cry, a lesson that Jesse taught him a n all it’s irony.

Cast
 Andie MacDowell as Monique ("Money") Lamont
 Daniel Sunjata as Win ("Geronimo") Garano
 Diahann Carroll as Garano's grandmother ("Nana")
 Edsson Morales as Jesus Baptista

Reception
Reviews were mixed. David Hinckley, in the Daily News, wrote "This Lifetime adaptation of Patricia Cornwell's thriller At Risk is smarter and better than the average TV movie." while April MacIntyre in Monsters and Critics criticized inconsistencies in the plot; she said "In this day and age of empty coffers it is a stretch at best to think Massachusetts' tax payer funds would be earmarked to solve a Tennessee cold case murder.  Another annoyance for me, as an ex resident of Essex county, is the confusion of county names.  Boston is Suffolk County.  Why that detail was cocked up is beyond me." and according to Laura Fries in Variety, the film "has a talented cast and polished tech credits, but they just don't yield much of a movie".

References

External links

At Risk at Rotten Tomatoes

2010 television films
2010 films
Crime television films
American thriller television films
Films about Native Americans
2010 crime thriller films
Films based on American novels
American crime thriller films
2010s English-language films
2010s American films